Qaracəmirli (also, Garajamirli, Qaracamirli and Karadzhamirli) is a village and municipality in the Shamkir Rayon / Shamkhor of Azerbaijan.  It has a population of 5,243.

See also 
 Persian propyleion, Karacamirli

References 

Populated places in Shamkir District
Elizavetpol Governorate